The Wild Wind Islets comprise a group of five steep rocky unpopulated islets located close to the south-western coast of Tasmania, Australia. The Wild Wind Islets are part of the Southwest National Park and the Tasmanian Wilderness World Heritage Site.

Fauna
The island is part of the Port Davey Islands Important Bird Area, so identified by BirdLife International because of its importance for breeding seabirds. Recorded breeding seabird species are the short-tailed shearwater, (20,000 pairs), fairy prion (3000 pairs), common diving-petrel (3000 pairs) and silver gull.  The white-bellied sea-eagle has nested there.  The metallic skink is present.

See also

 List of islands of Tasmania

References

Islands of South West Tasmania
Important Bird Areas of Tasmania
Protected areas of Tasmania